Buprestis confluenta is a species of metallic wood-boring beetle in the family Buprestidae. It is found in North America.

Subspecies
These two subspecies belong to the species Buprestis confluenta:
 Buprestis confluenta confluenta
 Buprestis confluenta tessellata Casey

References

Further reading

 
 
 

Buprestidae
Articles created by Qbugbot
Beetles described in 1823